The 2023 LA Galaxy II season is the club's 10th season of existence, and their first season in the MLS Next Pro.

Squad information

Transfers

Transfers in

Transfers out

Competitions

Friendlies 
LA Galaxy II announced the friendlies schedule on February 2, 2023.

MLS Next Pro

Western Conference

Overall table

Regular season 
The full schedule was announced on March 14.

All times in Pacific Time Zone.

See also 
 2023 in American soccer
 2023 LA Galaxy season

References

External links 
 

LA Galaxy II seasons
2023 MLS Next Pro season
LA Galaxy II
LA Galaxy II